Duncan MacMillan is an American mathematician, philanthropist, and businessman known for being one of the four founders of Bloomberg L.P. MacMillan is not to be confused with Whitney Duncan MacMillan, who inherited his billions in agribusiness.

Early life and education
MacMillan served four years in the United States Marine Corps after which he went to college. In 1966, MacMillan earned a Bachelor of Science degree in Mathematics from Rutgers University. In 1967, he began his career working at Bankers Trust.

Career
MacMillan worked at the investment bank Salomon Brothers with Michael Bloomberg, Thomas Secunda and Charles Zegar. After Bloomberg - who was Salomon's former head of equity trading and sales and then head of computer systems and data - was fired when he opposed the takeover of the company by Phibro, a metals trading company, he invited Zegar, Secunda, and Macmillan to start up their own financial data company. They accepted and together they founded Innovative Market Systems, with Bloomberg investing $300,000, the majority of seed capital. Secunda, who was a mathematician, was responsible for analytics; MacMillan was the expert in customer needs; and Zegar created the software. In 1982, they got their first customer, Merrill Lynch who ordered 20 data terminals and invested $30 million in the company (receiving a 30 percent ownership interest). The company grew rapidly thereafter and presently has $7.6B in sales and over 15,000 employees.  Bloomberg owns 88% of the company and the three other partners 4% each (In 2008, Bloomberg purchased back Merrill Lynch's original 30% share).

Philanthropy
MacMillan is a Member of the Dean's Advisory Committee; he is a member of the Foundation of The Medical Center at Princeton. He has endowed a Professorship of Genetics at Rutgers University and a Professorship in Theoretical Computer Science at The Institute for Advanced Study. He is also a generous supporter of The Cancer Institute of New Jersey where he serves on the board of directors. His wife Nancy is a trustee of the Institute for Advanced Study and the American Repertory Ballet. MacMillan and his wife are signatories of The Giving Pledge.

Personal life
MacMillan is married to Nancy MacMillan whom he met while working at Bankers Trust. Nancy has a B.A. in economics and mathematics from Connecticut College, a M.A. in economics from Hunter College, and a Master of Business Administration in finance from Rider University. They have two children: Kevin
and Alissa.

References

Year of birth missing (living people)
Living people
American philanthropists
Bloomberg L.P. founders
Giving Pledgers
21st-century philanthropists
United States Marines
Rutgers University alumni